Arthur Skinner (24 May 1919 – 18 February 1993) was a British sports shooter. He competed in the 50 metre rifle, prone event at the 1960 Summer Olympics.

References

1919 births
1993 deaths
British male sport shooters
Olympic shooters of Great Britain
Shooters at the 1960 Summer Olympics
People from Ampthill